Skopytce is a municipality and village in Tábor District in the South Bohemian Region of the Czech Republic. It has about 200 inhabitants.

Administrative parts
The village of Chabrovice is an administrative part of Skopytce.

References

Villages in Tábor District